Kenneth P. Green is a social worker and Democratic and Independent politician from Hartford, Connecticut. He served as a Representative to the Connecticut House of Representatives for Connecticut's 1st assembly district.

Early life
Green was born in Hartford, Connecticut. He has a BA in Social Science from Hampshire College and earned a MA in Social Work at the University of Connecticut School of Social Work in 1979.

Political career
Green represented Connecticut's 1st assembly district from 1994 to 2010. During his legislative career he chaired Connecticut's Legislative Black and Puerto Rican Caucus. In 2010, Green lost the Democratic primary to challenger Matthew Ritter; 1,153 votes to 1,151 votes. In 2017, Green ran as an Independent in a three way race for Connecticut House of Representatives District 7 against Democrat Rickey Pinckney Sr. and Working Families Party candidate Joshua Malik Hall.

References

Democratic Party members of the Connecticut House of Representatives
Politicians from Hartford, Connecticut
Living people
Hampshire College alumni
University of Connecticut alumni
Year of birth missing (living people)